Ernesto Revé Serrano (born 12 February 1992 in Guantánamo) is a Cuban triple jumper. Revé won gold medal at the 2014 IAAF World Indoor Championships and silver medal 2010 World Junior Championships in Athletics.

Personal bests

International competitions

References

External links

Tilastopaja biography

Living people
1992 births
Sportspeople from Guantánamo
Cuban male triple jumpers
Pan American Games medalists in athletics (track and field)
Athletes (track and field) at the 2015 Pan American Games
Pan American Games bronze medalists for Cuba
Athletes (track and field) at the 2016 Summer Olympics
Olympic athletes of Cuba
Olympic male triple jumpers
Central American and Caribbean Games gold medalists for Cuba
Competitors at the 2014 Central American and Caribbean Games
Central American and Caribbean Games medalists in athletics
Medalists at the 2015 Pan American Games
World Athletics Indoor Championships winners
21st-century Cuban people